The (Omihachiman City Rooftile Museum) is a museum in Ōmihachiman, Shiga, Japan, devoted to Japanese-style roof tiles (kawara).

Buildings 
The museum consists of ten buildings with roof tiles which form a whole pavilion. The new tiles on the roof of the museum were blackened to make them look older and thus fit in better with the other buildings in the neighborhood.

Exhibits 
In the permanent exhibition room on the first floor objects are displayed to show the history of Omihachiman roof tiles and the process by which they are made. Images of the city of Omihachiman are displayed at the entrance, and there is a large 3-dimensional photograph of the roof tiles of the houses in Shinmachi street at the innermost corner of the exhibition room.

See also
 Onigawara, a type of Japanese roof ornamentation

References

External links

 Omihachiman City information 

Museums in Shiga Prefecture
Ōmihachiman, Shiga
Ceramics museums in Japan
Museums established in 1995
1995 establishments in Japan